Drinkstone Windmills are a pair of windmills at Drinkstone, Suffolk, England. They consist a post mill  and a smock mill. The post mill is Grade I listed and the smock mill is Grade II* listed. The mills were known as Clover's Mills as they were always worked by the Clover family.

Post mill
Drinkstone Post Mill was built as an open trestle post mill. A brick and flint roundhouse was added in 1830. The mill was originally powered by Common sails. Spring sails were fitted during the nineteenth century and the mill was finally worked with one pair of spring and one pair of common sails. The mill has a wooden windshaft with a cast iron poll end, which was fitted by the millwright C Sillitoe of Long Melford. In the 1920s, an air brake was fitted to the sails, but the scheme was not successful and was abandoned Winding was by tailpole until the 1940s, when the fantail carriage from Barley Green Mill, Stradbroke was fitted. This was worked by a winch to start with and the fantail from Thurston Mill was fitted during World War Two. The fantail from Woolpit Mill was fitted in 1963.

The frame of the mill shows its age, there being no side girts. The body has been extended in the breast and tail, and the mill may have been reconstructed so that the original breast of the mill is now the tail.  The mill has two pairs of millstones. The structure is currently on the Heritage at Risk Register.

Post mill history
Drinkstone Post Mill was built in 1689, making it the oldest windmill in Suffolk. Samuel Clover was given the post mill, horse mill and mill house by his father (Samuel Sr) in 1775. The mill passed to his son (Samuel Jr, b1752) and thence through a succession of Clovers to Wilfred, who took the mill on the death of his father Daniel in 1947. On 28 February 1949 the mill was tailwinded, damaging the sails and fantail. The mill became derelict until Mr Clover restored it in 1962 and put her back to work

Smock mill
Drinkstone Smock Mill was built in 1780 on a horse mill which had been in existence in 1689.  The mill is a two-storey smock mill on a single-storey base, which originally housed a horse mill.  The mill has a pepperpot cap which was originally winded by a chain and wheel,  a fantail being added towards the end of her working life. The mill was last worked with a pair of Common sails and a pair of Spring sails. The windshaft was a wooden one. The millstones were supported on a hurst frame, an arrangement usually found in a watermill.

Millers

Samuel Clover Sr – 1775
Samuel Clover 1775 –
Samuel Clover Jr
John Clover
Daniel Clover
Mrs Clover – 1900
Daniel Clover 1900 – 1947
Wilfred Clover 1947 – 1949, 1962 –
Reference for above:-

Culture and media
Drinkstone post mill was featured in the Dad's Army episode "Don't Forget the Diver" in which Lance Corporal Jones went round on the sails of the mill and was thrown off into a pond.

External links
Windmill World webpage on Drinkstone post mill.
Windmill World webpage on Drinkstone smock mill.

References

Windmills in Suffolk
Mid Suffolk District
Post mills in the United Kingdom
Smock mills in England
Windmills completed in 1689
Windmills completed in 1780
1689 establishments in England